The 2014 EBSA European Snooker Championships took place in Sofia, Bulgaria. It was won by eighth seed Mitchell Mann who defeated second seed John Whitty 7–2 in an all-English final. Mann had taken a 5–0 lead in the match, before Whitty won the sixth and seventh s. For winning the tournament, Mann was rewarded with a place on the professional World Snooker Tour for the 2014–15 and 2015–16 seasons. Mann took a 5–0 lead in the final,

Results

References

2014 in snooker
Snooker amateur tournaments
Sports competitions in Sofia
2014 in Bulgarian sport
International sports competitions hosted by Bulgaria